Aroga argutiola is a moth of the family Gelechiidae. It is found in North America, where it has been recorded from Alabama, Louisiana, Maine, Michigan, Mississippi, New York, Ontario, Quebec and South Carolina.

Adults have been recorded on wing from April to September.

Larvae have been reared on Comptonia peregrina, but have also been recorded on Myrica aspleniifolia. They construct a nest by tying leaves together, and then feeding on the leaves in and adjacent to the nest. The species overwinters as a final instar larva on the ground in a cocoon.

References

Moths described in 1974
Aroga
Moths of North America